Quarter Branch is a  long second-order tributary to Marshyhope Creek in Kent and Sussex Counties Delaware.

Course
Quarter Branch rises on the Cart Branch divide about 1.5 miles northwest of Greenwood, Delaware, and then flows generally northwest to join Marshyhope Creek at Adamsville, Delaware.

Watershed
Quarter Branch drains  of area, receives about 45.0 in/year of precipitation, and is about 4.38% forested.

See also
List of rivers of Delaware

References

Rivers of Delaware
Rivers of Kent County, Delaware
Rivers of Sussex County, Delaware